A special election was held in  on March 2, 1802, to fill a vacancy left by the resignation of Richard Sprigg, Jr. (DR) on December 11, 1801.

Election results

Bowie took office on March 24, 1802

See also
List of special elections to the United States House of Representatives

References

Maryland 1802 02
1802 02
Maryland 02
1802 Maryland elections
United States House of Representatives 1802 02